Erik Chinander (born December 19, 1979) is an American football coach. He is currently defensive lineLine coach at the Boise State University. He played college football for Iowa. He was also Scott Frost's defensive coordinator at UCF for two years, including the undefeated 2017 UCF team that was ranked No. 6 in the final AP Poll.

References

External links
 
 Nebraska Cornhuskers bio

1979 births
Living people
American football offensive linemen
Iowa Hawkeyes football players
Oregon Ducks football coaches
Nebraska Cornhuskers football coaches
Northern Iowa Panthers football coaches
Philadelphia Eagles coaches
UCF Knights football coaches
Junior college football coaches in the United States